The people listed below were all born in, residents of, or otherwise closely associated with Tuskegee, Alabama:

Activism
Rosa Parks, African American civil rights activist
Sammy Younge Jr., Civil Rights Movement activist and voting rights activist

Art
Frederick Arthur Bridgman, artist known for his paintings of "Orientalist" subjects

Athletics
Cleveland "Cleve" Abbott, coach
Alice Coachman, first African American female Olympic gold medalist, high jump
Herman Hill, former Major League Baseball player
Stanley Jackson, former NBA player
Ken Johnson, former forward for the Portland Trail Blazers
Rimp Lanier, former Major League Baseball player
Chad Lucas, professional football wide receiver
Zeke Moore, former cornerback for the Houston Oilers
Chukie Nwokorie, former NFL player
James Patrick, Canadian football safety
Gilbert Renfroe, former professional football quarterback
Gerald Robinson, former Auburn University and NFL defensive end
Andre Thornton, major league baseball player
Tony Tolbert, former defensive end for the Dallas Cowboys
Frank Walker, NFL cornerback
Rory White, NBA player for the Phoenix Suns, San Diego/Los Angeles Clippers, and the Milwaukee Bucks
Willie Whitehead, former Auburn University and NFL defensive end

Education
Howard R. Lamar, historian of the American West and a former president of Yale University
Booker T. Washington, educator, author, orator, and leader in the African-American community

Government
Eric Motley, former U.S. State Department official and director of the Aspen Institute
Frank Park, U.S. Representative for Georgia's 2nd congressional district from 1913 to 1925
Edward W. Pou, U.S. Representative from North Carolina's 4th District from 1901 to 1934
Charles Winston Thompson, U.S. Representative from 1901 to 1904
Myron Herbert Thompson, Senior Judge for the United States District Court for the Middle District of Alabama
Michael L. Vaughn, politician who represents District 24 in the Maryland House of Delegates
Otis D. Wright II, U.S. District Judge on the United States District Court for the Central District of California

Literature
Clarissa Scott Delany,  poet, essayist, educator and social worker associated with the Harlem Renaissance
Sadie Peterson Delaney, chief librarian of the Tuskegee Veterans Administration Medical Center for 34 years and a pioneer in bibliotherapy
Angela Johnson, poet and writer of children's books
Nella Larsen, author of the Harlem Renaissance
Phyllis Alesia Perry, novelist and journalistMilitary
Theodore W. Brevard, Jr., officer in the Confederate States Army
William A. Campbell, member of the Tuskegee Airmen
Lt Gen Russell C. Davis, former Commanding General of the District of Columbia National Guard
Evander McIvor Law, American Civil War general
 The Tuskegee Airmen

Music
Dave Edwards, multireedist and lead alto saxophonist for the Lawrence Welk Show
Tom Joyner, nationally syndicated radio DJ
Lionel Richie, graduated from Tuskegee University, rhythm & blues singer, songwriter, musician, record producer and occasional actor
Caughey Roberts, jazz alto sax player best known for his time in the Count Basie Orchestra in the 1930s

Science
Keith Black, neurosurgeon
George Washington Carver, botanist
Adriel Johnson, biologist and faculty member at the University of Alabama in Huntsville who was killed in the University of Alabama in Huntsville shooting

Television
Robin Roberts, anchor of Good Morning America''
Keenen Ivory Wayans, actor, comedian, writer, director

References

Tuskegee
Tuskegee, Alabama